Bernard Kinsey is a Los Angeles philanthropist and entrepreneur with a passion for African-American history and art of the 19th and 20h centuries. He and his wife, Shirley, have been called "one of the most admired and respected couples in Los Angeles." They are known for espousing two life principles, “To whom much is given much is required" and live “A life of no regrets”. The couple have one son, Khalil, who is the general manager and curator of The Kinsey African American Art and History Collection and foundation.

Personal life
Bernard Kinsey was born and raised in West Palm Beach, Florida in Palm Beach County.  He is the son of a prominent African American family from Palm Beach County, Florida.  Bernard Kinsey's father is the late Mr. U.B. Kinsey who became one of the first African American principals of a public school in Palm Beach County, Florida.

Bernard Kinsey obtained an MBA from Pepperdine University and received his Honorary Doctorates from Florida A&M University and Alabama A & M University. He is a member of the Omega Psi Phi fraternity. He is a longtime member of First African Methodist Episcopal Church of Los Angeles.

Career
Kinsey had a twenty-year association with the Xerox Corporation.  Kinsey helped form the Xerox Black Employees Association.  It was through this association that increased the hiring of blacks from 121 employees in 1971, to over 14,000 in 1991.  Kinsey was responsible for the direct hiring of nearly one thousand Blacks, Latinos and females. Kinsey was a Vice President for nearly ten years; he also managed Xerox’s largest sales and marketing division.

During his Xerox career, Kinsey awarded Jackson State University a one million dollar computer grant.  In that same year, Kinsey awarded grants in the amount of $250,000 to establish seven career computer centers in both Northern and Southern California.  Through the establishment of these centers, over 2,000 people were trained and hired.  In 1990, he was a key member of the Mandela Freedom Fund Committee, which raised over $1.2 million.  Kinsey was also chairman of the First Magic Johnson United Negro College Fund Banquet All-Star game. He led a drive with Xerox black employees resulting in a $100,000 donation to the United Negro College Fund.

An international business consultant, in December 1995, Kinsey was appointed as Honorary Consul General by the U.S. State Department and the Central African Republic.  His extensive international experience includes the establishment of the Beijing Printing Center, the first successful venture of its type in the People’s Republic of China.  Kinsey has counseled the governments of South Africa, Germany, England, and France in economic development.

Kinsey’s career has included being a political commentator, international business consultant, writer, and speaker.

Rebuild L.A.
In 1992, Bernard Kinsey was selected as chief operating officer and co-chairman of Rebuild L.A. under Peter Ueberroth. Rebuild L.A.'s mission was economic redevelopment because of the financial devastation that resulted from the 1992 Los Angeles riots. As Co-Chairman of Rebuild L.A., Bernard Kinsey was responsible for generating more than 380 million dollars in investments from the private sector for the inner city of Los Angeles. Kinsey also helped to recruit various retail businesses to the community.

Philanthropy
Bernard and Shirley Kinsey's 50-year marriage and partnership represents an alliance based on love, respect, and the importance of friends and family. The two have raised over 22 million dollars for charitable and educational organizations, 11 million dollars to their alma mater, Florida A & M University and 7 million dollars for United Way. The couple was one of the early financial supporters of the “NAACP Image Awards” and “Real Men Cook” for prostate cancer

Through their leadership, Bernard and Shirley Kinsey have assisted the College Bound organization, helping raise over $3.5 million for one hundred and eighty-five scholarships. Additionally, their efforts contributed to $125,000 being raised for the Rosa Parks Foundation. They have contributed or raised over one million dollars in scholarships for the Southern California Alumni Chapter of FAMU, which has provided scholarships for over 130 young people from Los Angeles to attend FAMU.  As Chairman of the Florida A&M Cluster from 1984 to 1991, Bernard Kinsey's efforts resulted in 9 million dollars being contributed to FAMU, making him the largest fund-raisers for FAMU. He was also President of the 55,000-member Florida A & M National Alumni Association.

For over 10 years The Kinseys have sponsored The Sunday Gospel Hour on KJLH Radio for both First A.M.E. Church and West Angeles Church of God in Christ, the most listened-to broadcast on Black radio in Los Angeles. They were Executive Producers with David E. Talbert and produced: Love on Lay Away. He Say She Say, and Fabric of a Man, to sold-out audiences. They have also co-produced movies with award-winning filmmaker Reuben Cannon.

Bernard Kinsey was also a board member of the William H. Johnson Foundation for the Arts, established in 2001, from 2002-2005.  The purpose of the foundation is to encourage minority artists early in their careers, by offering them financial grants. On February 6, 2006, Kinsey was honored by the Black Legacy of Giving Foundation for his work as a black leader and philanthropist in education and the arts.

The Kinsey Collection
Bernard and Shirley are widely heralded for their stewardship of art, books and manuscripts that document and tell the story of African Americans' triumphs and struggles from 1632 to present.  From September 2009 through March 2010, The Kinsey Collection: “Shared Treasures of Bernard and Shirley Kinsey, is on display at the Brogan Museum, in Tallahassee, Florida.  In 2009, the Norton Museum of Art in West Palm Beach hosted their collection entitled "In the Hands of African American Collectors".  Through the Norton's partnership with the School District of Palm Beach County, Florida  more than 12,000 students visited the exhibit which helped the exhibit garner an award from the Institute of Museum and Library Services that was presented by First Lady Laura Bush at a special ceremony at the White House.
 
Already having been seen by millions on television and radio nationally, The Kinsey Collection is one of the largest private collections of artifacts tracing African-American history. It includes sculptures, paintings, and documents with rich historical value. Among their treasures are rarities such as a letter written by Malcolm X to Alex Haley two years before the 1965 assassination of Malcolm X. According to a CBS Sunday Morning News report, the Kinseys have works of art displayed throughout their home.

Charmaine Jefferson, an executive director of the California African-American Museum in Los Angeles where their exhibit was featured in 2006, is quoted as saying "...The story, the feeling, the sensation for African Americans about who we are and where we come from and what we don't know about ourselves, comes from being able to look at this collective work.  And so this collection is powerful for that reason."

References

External links
The Kinsey Collection

American philanthropists
American businesspeople
American art collectors
Collectors
Living people
Miami Floridians
Florida A&M University alumni
1943 births